The Triumph of the Heart (Swedish: Hjärtats triumf) is a 1929 Swedish silent drama film directed by Gustaf Molander and starring Carl Brisson, Lissy Arna and Edvin Adolphson. It was shot at the Råsunda Studios in Stockholm. The film's sets were designed by the art director Vilhelm Bryde. The film was made in partnership with British International Pictures and was given a British release in 1930 under the alternative title of False Gold.

Cast
 Carl Brisson as Lars Holm  
 Lissy Arna as Märta Tamm  
 Edvin Adolphson as Torsten Bergström 
 Harry Ahlin as Miner  
 Bengt Djurberg as Miner  
 Weyler Hildebrand as Miner 
 Axel Hultman as Axel Tamm  
 Lisskulla Jobs as Young Woman  
 Anna Lindahl as Eva Bergström  
 Tor Weijden as Miner  
 Waldemar Wohlström as Heikka

References

Bibliography
 Tommy Gustafsson. Masculinity in the Golden Age of Swedish Cinema: A Cultural Analysis of 1920s Films. McFarland, 2014.

External links

1929 films
Swedish silent feature films
Films directed by Gustaf Molander
Swedish black-and-white films
1920s Swedish-language films
Swedish drama films
1929 drama films
Silent drama films
1920s Swedish films